The Israel Ministry of Defense - Directorate of Defense Research & Development (IMOD DDR&D), abbreviated Maf'at (מפא"ת), is a joint administrative body of the Israeli Ministry of Defense and Israel Defense Forces that coordinates between the Ministry of Defense, the IDF, the military industries, Israel Military Industries, Israel Aerospace Industries, Rafael Advanced Defense Systems, the Institute for Biological Research and the Space Agency.

Operations
Promoting the technological and scientific infrastructure needed for military research and development
Deciding on the direction of research and development
Analysis and coordination of work related to research and development
Purchasing and project management for the IDF arms
Maintaining relations with foreign elements in security-related areas of research and development and infrastructure
Providing information to those in the Security Forces who engage in research and development.
Operating the Talpiot program for IDF recruits interested in research and development; the Psagot Excellence Program for the intense education and then utilization of elite IDF recruits chosen to be elite R&D engineers, and the Katzir Fellowships Program for promoting technological human resources

Maf'at central operating bodies
War Material Development
Research and Technological Infrastructure
External Relations
Planning Administrations [Serves as the organizational framework for central projects, operating as independent or partially integrated bodies]

Staff and support bodies
Planning and Operations
Computerization
Human Resources
Communication
Controllership
Defense
Management

Ministry of Defense purchasing divisions
Maf'at employs both civilians from the Ministry of Defense and IDF personal. It is one of five other Ministry of Defense purchasing divisions: 

Production and Purchasing Administration
Building Branch
Logistical Operations and Assets Branch
Planning Administrations [See above]
Overseas Purchasing Missions

Administration head
The Administration is currently headed by Brigadier General (Ret.) Danny Gold, who is one of three civilian members in the General Staff.

References

Official site (Israeli Ministry of Defense) 
"The Purchasing Bodies," (Israeli Ministry of Defense) 

Ministry of Defense (Israel)